The 1888 All-Ireland Senior Football Championship was unfinished owing to the American Invasion Tour, an unsuccessful attempt to raise funds for a revival of the Tailteann Games.

The 1888 provincial championships had been completed (Tipperary, Kilkenny and Monaghan winning them; no Connacht teams entered) but after the Invasion tour returned, the All-Ireland semi-final and final were not played.

Results

Leinster

Wicklow used illegal players, and the game was stopped by a pitch invasion with ten minutes to go, so a replay was ordered.

Munster

Limerick were awarded the game due to Clare playing illegal players.

Ulster

Neither team could field the full 21 players, so 15-a-side was agreed.

Championship statistics

Miscellaneous
 No All Ireland series due to US tour.

Sligo and Mayo played a draw in the Connacht final. There is no record of a replay.

References